Eremaula is a genus of moths of the family Noctuidae.

Species
 Eremaula minor (Butler, 1886)

References
Natural History Museum Lepidoptera genus database
Eremaula at funet

Hadeninae